The Flying Yankee was a diesel-electric streamliner built in 1935 for the Maine Central Railroad and the Boston and Maine Railroad by Budd Company and with mechanical and electrical equipment from Electro-Motive Corporation. It was also the name of a passenger train, the third streamliner train in North America. 
That train ceased passenger service in 1957 and is stored at the Hobo Railroad in New Hampshire and owned by the state of New Hampshire, which plans to open it to public viewing at some time in the future.

History
Prior to 1935, the name Flying Yankee referred to a passenger train that ran between Portland, Maine, and Boston, Massachusetts, at least back to 1891. The train was pulled by an early 4-6-2 Pacific steam engine; cars were standard heavyweight construction.  

The new Flying Yankee in the 1930s was a lightweight train constructed with welded stainless steel using Budd's patented process. The engine was an 8-cylinder Winton 201-A diesel, driving a generator; the lead truck was equipped with traction motors. It was fitted with air conditioning in all cars. No dining car was provided; instead, meals were prepared in a galley and served to passengers in trays that clipped to the back of the seat in front.

It was the third streamliner in service after the Union Pacific Railroad's M-10000 and the Chicago, Burlington and Quincy Railroad's Pioneer Zephyr. The Flying Yankee was a virtual clone of the latter, except that it dispensed with the baggage/mail space to seat 142 in three articulated cars.

The train was delivered in February 1935, and toured the BM-MEC railroad system before entering service on April 1. This schedule was kept six days a week; the trainset spent Sundays undergoing maintenance. The train proved extremely successful, attracting new ridership and earning a profit for its owners.

Later on, as newer equipment replaced it on one route, it would be switched to other routes, bearing the names The Cheshire, The Minuteman, The Mountaineer, and The Business Man.

As railroad passenger ridership declined in the 1950s, the Yankee was also getting old, and thus the trainset, as The Minuteman, was retired, running its last on May 7, 1957. 

Most of the train's route is currently operated by Amtrak's Downeaster, which runs as far north as Brunswick, Maine.

Current location 

The railroad donated the trainset to the Edaville Railroad tourist/museum operation in Carver, Massachusetts, in 1957. The train remained on static display there for about 35 years until it was moved in 1993 to Glen, New Hampshire, after being purchased by Bob Morrell, then-owner of Story Land.

In 1997, the train was moved to the Concord and Claremont Railroad's shops in Claremont, New Hampshire, for a restoration after it was purchased by the state of New Hampshire. By 2004, the major structural restoration had been completed, and detailed restoration of components is ongoing with the goal of restoring the train completely to running condition. The train was moved on August 10, 2005, to the Hobo Railroad in Lincoln, New Hampshire.

Plans to move it to Concord, New Hampshire, site of a former Boston & Maine railyard, fell through in 2017. The state hopes to open the train to public viewing in Lincoln.

Models 

HO scale

 Orion Models/NJ Custom Brass.  1985.  Imported scale brass model.
 Challenger Imports.  Imported scale brass model.

O scale

 Lionel.  "pre-war", produced from 1935 to 1941.  Not a scale model.  "3 rail" AC power.
 Sunset/3rd Rail.  Imported brass model.  Available in both "3 rail" AC and "2 rail" DC power.  Scale model, not "selectively compressed"
 Lionel.  2008.  Reproduction of pre-war model.

References

Further reading

External links
 B&M/MC Flying Yankee Boston-Bangor April 1936 timetable at Streamliner Schedules

Boston and Maine Railroad
Maine Central Railroad
Budd multiple units
Named passenger trains of the United States
North American streamliner trains
Articulated passenger trains
Railway services introduced in 1935
Railway services discontinued in 1957
Streamliner trains